The 1987–88 Hellenic Football League season was the 35th in the history of the Hellenic Football League, a football competition in England.

Premier Division

The Premier Division featured 16 clubs which competed in the division last season, along with two new clubs, promoted from Division One:
Bishop's Cleeve
Didcot Town

League table

Division One

Division One featured 14 clubs which competed in the division last season, along with two new clubs:
The Herd, joined from the Cheltenham League
Wantage Town, relegated from the Premier Division

Also, Almondsbury Greenway changed name to Almondsbury Picksons.

League table

References

External links
 Hellenic Football League

1987-88
8